Guido Wolf may refer to:

 Guido Wolf (politician) (born 1961), German politician
 Guido Wolf (sports shooter) (born 1924), Liechtenstein sports shooter